Mohammad Hadrab (born November 6, 1984 in Jordan) is a Jordanian professional basketball player. He plays for Zaid of the Jordanian basketball league. He also is a member of the Jordan national basketball team.

Career
Hamdan debuted for the Jordanian team at the FIBA Asia Championship 2009. He helped the squad to a national best third-place finish by averaging 5.3 points and 3.4 rebounds per game off the bench.

References

1984 births
Living people
Jordanian men's basketball players
Basketball players at the 2006 Asian Games
Basketball players at the 2010 Asian Games
Power forwards (basketball)
2010 FIBA World Championship players
Small forwards
Asian Games competitors for Jordan